Galianthe is a genus of flowering plants in the family Rubiaceae. The genus is found from Mexico to tropical America.

Species

Galianthe andersonii 
Galianthe angustifolia 
Galianthe aurelii 
Galianthe bisepala 
Galianthe bogotensis 
Galianthe boliviana 
Galianthe brasiliensis 
Galianthe canindeyuensis 
Galianthe centranthoides 
Galianthe chiquitosiana 
Galianthe chodatiana 
Galianthe cymosa 
Galianthe cyperoides 
Galianthe dichotoma 
Galianthe elegans 
Galianthe equisetoides 
Galianthe eupatorioides 
Galianthe fastigiata 
Galianthe gertii 
Galianthe grandifolia 
Galianthe guaranitica 
Galianthe hassleriana 
Galianthe hispidula 
Galianthe humilis 
Galianthe kempffiana 
Galianthe krausei 
Galianthe lanceifolia 
Galianthe latistipula 
Galianthe laxa 
Galianthe liliifolia 
Galianthe linearifolia 
Galianthe longifolia 
Galianthe longisepala 
Galianthe macedoi 
Galianthe matogrossiana 
Galianthe montesii 
Galianthe parvula 
Galianthe peruviana 
Galianthe polygonoides 
Galianthe pseudopetiolata 
Galianthe ramosa 
Galianthe reitzii 
Galianthe souzae 
Galianthe sudyungensis 
Galianthe thalictroides 
Galianthe vaginata 
Galianthe valerianoides 
Galianthe verbenoides

References

Rubiaceae genera
Spermacoceae